Jules Crépieux-Jamin (1859–1940) was a French graphologist born in Arras.

From 1889 Crépieux-Jamin worked as a dentist in Rouen. He was deeply interested in the works of Jean-Hippolyte Michon (1806–1881), who is considered to be the founder of modern graphology (science of handwriting analysis). For much of his career Crépieux-Jamin analyzed and revised Michon's work, which included reclassification and re-grouping the system of "handwriting signs", and developing new rules on their classification.

In his 1929 book ABC de la graphologie he laid out a classification system of seven categories in which 175 graphological signs are grouped. The seven categories he used are titled: Dimension, Form, Pressure, Speed, Direction, Layout and Continuity. As an example the category "Form" would contain various graphological signs such as: "rounded", "ornate", "harmonious", "confused", et al.

Crepieux-Jamin took a "holistic approach" to handwriting analysis, and to every element in the handwriting he applied a range of hypothetical meanings, maintaining that the value of a particular sign is not fixed, and its importance and interpretation are variable depending on other aspects in the writing being analyzed.

Writings 
 Traité Pratique de Graphologie, Flammarion, Paris
 L'écriture et le caractère (1888), PUF, Paris, 1951, 441 pages --- Handwriting and expression
 La graphologie en exemples (1898), Larousse, Paris.-- Graphology in examples 
 Les Bases fondamentales de la Graphologie et de l'expertise en écritures (1921)-- The fundamentals of graphology and expertise in writing
 L'Age et le sexe dans l'écriture (1924), Adyar, Paris --- Age and sex in handwriting
 Les éléments de l'écriture des canailles (1925), Flammarion, Paris.---The elements of the writing of scoundrels.
 L'ABC de la graphologie (1929), PUF, 1960, 667 pages--- The ABC of graphology. 
 Libres propos sur l'expertise en écritures et les leçons de l'Affaire Dreyfus, Alcan, 1935 --- On free writing expertise and lessons of the Dreyfus Affair.

References 
 The British Academy of Graphology (biography)
 Parts of this article are based on a translation of an equivalent article at the French Wikipedia.

People from Arras
1859 births
1940 deaths
French graphologists